The 2004–05 Hellenic Football League season was the 52nd in the history of the Hellenic Football League, a football competition in England.

Premier Division

Premier Division featured 18 clubs which competed in the division last season, along with four new clubs:
Ardley United, promoted from Division One West
Milton United, promoted from Division One East
Wantage Town, promoted from Division One East
Witney United, promoted from Division One West

League table

Division One East

Division One East featured 14 clubs which competed in the division last season, along with four clubs:
Banbury United reserves
Kintbury Rangers, joined from the North Berks League
Old Woodstock Town, transferred from Division One West
Wokingham & Emmbrook, new club formed as a merger of Wokingham Town from the Isthmian League and Emmbrook Sports from the Reading Football League

League table

Division One West

Division One West featured 15 clubs which competed in the division last season, along with three new clubs:
Hook Norton, relegated from the Premier Division
Trowbridge Town, joined from the Wiltshire League
Tytherington Rocks, joined from the Gloucestershire County League

League table

References

External links
 Hellenic Football League

2004-05
9